McCord's Hospital, originally McCord Zulu Hospital, is a hospital in Durban, South Africa.

It was founded "for the Zulu", by American Christian missionaries, physician Dr. James Bennett McCord and Margaret Mellen McCord, in 1909.

References 

Hospitals in KwaZulu-Natal